Mehmet Kara (born 21 November 1983) is a Turkish professional footballer who plays as a midfielder for VfL Kamen.

Career
In summer 2017, while at 3. Liga side Preußen Münster, Kara was demoted to the club's reserve team playing in the sixth-tier Westfalenliga.

References

External links
 

1983 births
Living people
People from Werne
German people of Turkish descent
Sportspeople from Arnsberg (region)
German footballers
Turkish footballers
Footballers from North Rhine-Westphalia
Association football midfielders
Süper Lig players
3. Liga players
2. Bundesliga players
Regionalliga players
Gaziantep F.K. footballers
Gaziantepspor footballers
Hammer SpVg players
SC Preußen Münster players
SC Paderborn 07 players
Gençlerbirliği S.K. footballers
Rot Weiss Ahlen players